Keith Michael Mason (born 19 July 1958 in Leicester) is a former professional footballer, who played for Leicester City and Huddersfield Town.

References

1958 births
Living people
English footballers
Footballers from Leicester
Association football goalkeepers
English Football League players
Leicester City F.C. players
Huddersfield Town A.F.C. players